Ramstein-Miesenbach is a Verbandsgemeinde ("collective municipality") in the district of Kaiserslautern, Rhineland-Palatinate, Germany. The seat of the Verbandsgemeinde is in Ramstein-Miesenbach.

The Verbandsgemeinde Ramstein-Miesenbach consists of the following Ortsgemeinden ("local municipalities"):

 Hütschenhausen
 Kottweiler-Schwanden
 Niedermohr
 Ramstein-Miesenbach
 Steinwenden

Verbandsgemeinde in Rhineland-Palatinate